Haliplus aliae is a species of water beetle in the genus Haliplus. It can be found in the Palearctic.

References

Haliplidae
Beetles described in 2003